Ethen Sampson (born 28 December 1993) is a South African soccer player. He is mainly deployed as a right back.

Club career
Sampson signed with Major League Soccer club Vancouver Whitecaps FC on 6 March 2014 after spending the 2013 season with their USL PDL feeder team.

Sampson made his professional debut in a 0–0 draw against D.C. United on 6 September 2014.

Vancouver declined its contract option on Sampson following the 2015 MLS season.

Career statistics

References

External links
 
 

1993 births
Living people
South African soccer players
South African expatriate soccer players
Vancouver Whitecaps FC U-23 players
Vancouver Whitecaps FC players
Whitecaps FC 2 players
Ubuntu Cape Town F.C. players
New Mexico United players
Baroka F.C. players
Black Leopards F.C. players
USL League Two players
Major League Soccer players
USL Championship players
Association football defenders
Homegrown Players (MLS)
South African expatriate sportspeople in Canada
South African expatriate sportspeople in the United States
Expatriate soccer players in Canada
Expatriate soccer players in the United States